Lu Minjia (Simplified Chinese:陆敏佳;born 29 December 1992) is a Chinese female track and field athlete who competes in the long jump. She was the 2009 World Youth Champion and set an Asian youth record of  that same year. After an Asian Junior title, she was runner-up at the 2011 Asian Athletics Championships. She won gold medals at the 2012 Asian Indoor Athletics Championships and the 2015 Asian Athletics Championships.

Lu represented her country at the Asian Games in 2010 and 2014, and has also represented the Asia-Pacific region at the IAAF Continental Cup (2014). She was the winner of the long jump at the 2009 National Games of China.

Career

Youth and junior career
Lu, from the eastern province of Zhejiang, first took up athletics while at primary school and her talent for long jumping was noticed. She continued with the discipline in the region, joining the provincial level athletics club and went on to study at Zhejiang University.

At fifteen, she was the youngest athlete in the field and defeated Asian indoor champion Chen Yaling, but had not performed well enough to earn qualification. In her first senior international competition she performed less well, but still managed a bronze medal at 2009 East Asian Games while Chen was the winner. She was the second highest ranked Asian woman that year, after Korea's Jung Soon-ok.

She also shared in the 4×100 metres relay silver medal with Chen Lin, Jiang Shan, and Wu Shuijiao (having been upgraded from bronze after Kazakhstan was disqualified). In her last major performance of the year, she placed sixth at the 2010 Asian Games, clearing  which was 17 cm short of Jung Soon-ok's winning result. Lu won her first national title at the Chinese Athletics Championships that year.

Asian senior medals
Going into the outdoor season, she was runner-up on countback to Japan's Saeko Okayama at the Golden Grand Prix in Kawasaki. She was close to this at the 2011 Asian Athletics Championships, a mark of  being the best of her series, and was ahead of Okayama but beaten into second place by Mayookha Johny. Afterwards, she defended her national title at the Chinese Championships.

She won her first senior title at the 2012 Asian Indoor Athletics Championships, beating Kazakhstan's Anastassya Kudinova to the gold. Turning to the outdoor track and field circuit, she missed the Shanghai Golden Grand Prix meeting, but made her IAAF Diamond League at the Prefontaine Classic in the United States, finishing tenth. Her best of the year came at the Kanchanaburi leg of the Asian Athletics Grand Prix, at which she jumped  to win ahead of India's Johny. She was herself beaten into second at the following leg in Bangkok by Uzbek Juliya Tarasova. She struggled the following year, failing to register a mark beyond six metres, and lost her title at the 12th National Games of China by ending the contest in eleventh place.

Lu returned to action in the 2014 season with her first appearance at the Shanghai Diamond League (coming tenth) and a third-place finish at the IAAF World Challenge Beijing. She was chosen as Asia's representative at the 2014 IAAF Continental Cup, finishing seventh, and placed sixth at the 2014 Asian Games. With her season's best of  she ranked in the top fifty globally that year and was joint best Asian athlete alongside her compatriot Jiang Yanfei.

Building on her silver from four years earlier, on home soil in Wuhan Lu won the long jump title at the 2015 Asian Athletics Championships by a five-centimetre margin over South Korea's Jung Soon-ok.

Personal bests
 Long jump outdoor:  (2009)
 Long jump indoor:  (2011)
All personal bests from IAAF

National titles
Chinese Athletics Championships
Long jump: 2010, 2011
National Games of China
Long jump: 2009

International competitions

References

External links

Image of Lu at the 2009 East Asian Games

Living people
1992 births
Athletes from Zhejiang
Chinese female long jumpers
Athletes (track and field) at the 2010 Asian Games
Athletes (track and field) at the 2014 Asian Games
Athletes (track and field) at the 2018 Asian Games
Zhejiang University alumni
World Athletics Championships athletes for China
Asian Games competitors for China
Asian Athletics Championships winners
21st-century Chinese women